Zăicani is a village in Rîșcani District, Moldova.

Notable people
 Gherman Pântea

References

Villages of Rîșcani District